The 2013 German Indoor Athletics Championships was the 60th edition of the national championship in indoor track and field for Germany. It was held on 23–24 February at the Helmut-Körnig-Halle in Dortmund. A total of 26 events, 13 for men and 13 for women, were contested plus five further events were held separately. It was to serve as preparation for the 2013 European Athletics Indoor Championships. The event was sold out on both days.

The combined events and racewalking national championships were held on 26–27 January at the Leichtathletikhalle Frankfurt-Kalbach in Kalbach-Riedberg. The 3 × 800 m and 3 × 1000 m relays were held on 17 February alongside the  German Indoor Youth Athletics Championships in Halle (Saale). 

Christina Schwanitz won the women's shot put with the best performance by any athlete that year.

Results

Men

Women

References

Results
Overall Results. German Athletics Federation. Retrieved 2021-04-06.

External links

German Athletics Federation website

German Indoor Athletics Championships
German Indoor Athletics Championships
German Indoor Athletics Championships
German Indoor Athletics Championships
Sports competitions in Dortmund